Mistress is an old form of address for a woman. It implies "lady of the house", especially a woman who is head of a household with domestic workers.

An example is Mistress Quickly in Shakespeare's The Merry Wives of Windsor. The title did not necessarily distinguish between married and unmarried women.

The titles Mrs., Miss and Ms. are abbreviations derived from Mistress.

Mastress is an obsolete form.

See also
Master (form of address)

References

Women's social titles